Scientific atheism may refer to:

 Marxist–Leninist atheism, a Communist doctrine and philosophical science formerly promoted in the Eastern Bloc
 New Atheism, a 21st-century atheist movement
 Relationship between religion and science, more general discussion